Bandiara is a village in the Oury Department of Balé Province in southern Burkina Faso. The village has a total population of 442.

References

Populated places in the Boucle du Mouhoun Region